The Russia women's national under-20 volleyball team represents Russia in international women's volleyball competitions and friendly matches under the age 20 and it is ruled by the Russian Volleyball Federation that is a member of the Federation of International Volleyball (FIVB) and also a part of the European Volleyball Confederation (CEV).

In response to the 2022 Russian invasion of Ukraine, the International Volleyball Federation suspended all Russian national teams, clubs, and officials, as well as beach and snow volleyball athletes, from all events. The European Volleyball Confederation (CEV) also banned all Russian national teams, clubs, and officials from participating in European competition, and suspended all members of Russia from their respective functions in CEV organs.

Results

FIVB U20 World Championship
 Champions   Runners up   Third place   Fourth place

Europe U19 Championship
 Champions   Runners up   Third place   Fourth place

Team

Recent squad
The following was the Russian roster in the 2019 FIVB Volleyball Women's U20 World Championship.

Head coach: Igor Kurnosov

Former squads

U20 World Championship
1997 —  Gold medal
Elena Vassilevskaya, Irina Tebenikhina,  Anna Artamonova, Olga Chukanova, Anastasia Belikova, Natalia Safronova, Ekaterina Gamova, Anjela Gourieva, Marina Ivanova, Tatiana Gorchkova, Elena Plotnikova and Ekaterina Shitselova
1999 —  Gold medal
Anna Artamonova, Olga Chukanova,  Anjela Gourieva, Ekaterina Gamova, Elena Konstantinova, Valeria Pouchnenkova, Tatiana Gorchkova, Olga Konovalova, Olessia Makarova, Anna Velikanova, Ekaterina Shitselova and Evguenia Kuzianina
2003 — 8th place
Natalia Korobkova, Anna Moisseenko,  Ekaterina Margatskaya, Viktoria Podkopaeva, Yulia Merkulova, Anna Gouryanova (c), Maria Borodakova, Irina Sukhova, Anna Zayko, Svetlana Akulova, Natalia Gladysheva and Zhanna Novikova
2005 — 7th place
Tatiana Alizarova, Tatiana Soldatova,  Anna Beskova, Anastasia Prisyagina, Ekaterina Kabeshova, Ekaterina Orlova, Anna Kosnyreva (c), Anastasia Markova, Ekaterina Gromova, Vera Ulyakina, Elena Irisova and Anna Arbuzova
2011 — 10th place
Maria Ivonkina, Yana Manzyuk,  Ekaterina Petrova, Ekaterina Lavrova, Alina Yaroshik (c), Valeria Safonova, Anastasia Lyapushkina, Anastasia Anufrienko, Anastasia Bavykina, Alla Galeeva, Alena Golosnova and Natalia Malykh
2013 — 6th place
Ekaterina Makarchuk, Irina Voronkova,  Tatiana Romanova, Olga Biryukova, Olesya Nikolaeva, Irina Fetisova, Anna Luneva, Valeriya Zaytseva, Elena Novik (c), Ksenia Ilchenko, Natalia Reshetnikova and Ekaterina Voronova
2015 — 7th place
Angelina Lazarenko, Svetlana Serbina,  Ekaterina Shkurikhina, Kristina Kurnosova, Ekaterina Novikova, Victoria Zhurbenko, Angelina Sperskaite (c), Anastasiia Barchuk, Anastasiia Cheremisina, Anna Lazareva, Tatiana Iurinskaia and Sabina Gilfanova
2017 —  Silver medal
Angelina Lazarenko, Ksenia Smirnova,  Anna Kotikova, Anastasia Stalnaya, Olga Zubareva, Alina Podskalnaya, Aleksandra Oganezova, Anastasiia Stankevichute, Victoria Russu, Daria Ryseva, Elizaveta Kotova and Maria Vorobyeva (c)
2019 —  Bronze medal
Varvara Shepeleva, Alexandra Borisova,  Eseniia Mishagina, Viktoriia Pushina, Olga Zvereva, Ekaterina Pipunyrova, Veronika Rasputnaia, Yulia Brovkina, Polina Shemanova, Valeriya Shevchuk (c), Elizaveta Fitisova and Oxana Yakushina

Europe U19 Championship
2006 — 4th place
Elena Boyarkina, Evgeniya Startseva,  Lidiya Romanova, Lyudmila Malofeeva, Elena Kovalenko, Irina Kuznetsova, Tatiana Kosheleva, Viktoria Rusakova, Natalia Dianskaya, Olga Fedorchenko, Yuliya Podskalnaya and Alexandra Vinogradova
2008 —  Silver medal
Ekaterina Bogacheva, Olga Efimova,  Anna Kiseleva, Anastasia Konovalova, Ksenia Naumova, Daria Pisarenko, Irina Smirnova, Ekaterina Pankova, Irina Uraleva, Viktoria Chervova, Olga Shukaylo and Tatiana Shchukina
2010 — 7th place
Maria Ivonkina, Yana Manzyuk,  Ekaterina Petrova, Alina Yaroshik (c), Natalia Krotkova, Anastasia Kornienko, Valeria Safonova, Anastasia Lyapushkina, Anastasia Bavykina, Anastasia Komogorova, Alla Galkina and Natalia Malykh
2012 — 4th place
Irina Voronkova,  Tatiana Romanova, Maria Bibina, Olesya Nikolaeva, Irina Fetisova, Anna Luneva, Eli Uatarra, Elena Novik (c), Anastasiia Barchuk, Ksenia Ilchenko, Ekaterina Voronova and Rimma Goncharova
2014 — 7th place
Svetlana Serbina,  Ekaterina Shkurikhina, Kristina Kurnosova, Ekaterina Novikova, Anastasia Grechanaia, Victoria Zhurbenko, Angelina Sperskaite (c), Anastasiia Barchuk, Anna Lazareva, Tatiana Iurinskaia, Natalia Guskova and Angelina Lazarenko
2016 —  Gold medal
Angelina Lazarenko, Inna Balyko,  Anna Kotikova, Anastasia Stalnaya, Alina Podskalnaya, Aleksandra Oganezova, Ksenia Pligunova, Anastasiia Stankevichute, Victoria Russu, Elizaveta Kotova, Marina Tushova and Maria Vorobyeva (c)
2018 —  Silver medal
Varvara Shepeleva, Tatiana Kadochkina, Alexandra Borisova,  Polina Matveeva, Viktoriia Pushina, Olga Zvereva, Ekaterina Pipunyrova, Veronika Rasputnaia, Yulia Brovkina, Irina Soboleva, Valeriya Shevchuk (c) and Oxana Yakushina

References

External links
 Official website 

National women's under-20 volleyball teams
Russia national volleyball team
Women's volleyball in Russia